The Grand Duchy of Lithuania was a European state that existed from the 13th century to 1795, when the territory was partitioned among the Russian Empire, the Kingdom of Prussia, and the Habsburg Empire of Austria. The state was founded by Lithuanians, who were at the time a polytheistic nation born from several united Baltic tribes from Aukštaitija.

The Grand Duchy expanded to include large portions of the former Kievan Rus' and other neighbouring states, including what is now Lithuania, Belarus, most of Ukraine as well as parts of Latvia, Poland, Russia and Moldova. At its greatest extent, in the 15th century, it was the largest state in Europe. It was a multi-ethnic and multiconfessional state, with great diversity in languages, religion, and cultural heritage.

The consolidation of the Lithuanian lands began in the late 13th century. Mindaugas, the first ruler of the Grand Duchy, was crowned as Catholic King of Lithuania in 1253. The pagan state was targeted in a religious crusade by the Teutonic Knights and the Livonian Order, but survived. Its rapid territorial expansion started late in the reign of Gediminas, and continued under the diarchy and co-leadership of his sons, Algirdas and Kęstutis. Algirdas's son Jogaila signed the Union of Krewo in 1386, bringing two major changes in the history of the Grand Duchy of Lithuania: conversion to Christianity of Europe's last pagan state, and establishment of a dynastic union between the Grand Duchy of Lithuania and the Crown of the Kingdom of Poland.

The reign of Vytautas the Great, son of Kęstutis, marked both the greatest territorial expansion of the Grand Duchy and the defeat of the Teutonic Knights in the Battle of Grunwald in 1410. It also marked the rise of the Lithuanian nobility. After Vytautas's death, Lithuania's relationship with the Kingdom of Poland greatly deteriorated. Lithuanian noblemen, including the Radvila family, attempted to break the personal union with Poland. However, unsuccessful wars with the Grand Duchy of Moscow forced the union to remain intact.

Eventually, the Union of Lublin of 1569 created a new state, the Polish–Lithuanian Commonwealth. In the Federation, the Grand Duchy of Lithuania maintained its political distinctiveness and had separate ministries, laws, army, and treasury. The federation was terminated by the passing of the Constitution of 3 May 1791, when it was supposed to become a single country, the Commonwealth, under one monarch, one parliament and no Lithuanian autonomy. Shortly afterward, the unitary character of the state was confirmed by adopting the Reciprocal Guarantee of Two Nations.

However, the newly reformed Commonwealth was invaded by Russia in 1792 and partitioned between neighbouring states. A truncated state (whose principal cities were Kraków, Warsaw and Vilnius) remained that was nominally independent. After the Kościuszko Uprising, the territory was completely partitioned among the Russian Empire, the Kingdom of Prussia and Austria in 1795.

Etymology

The name of Lithuania (Litua) was first mentioned in 1009 in Annals of Quedlinburg. Some older etymological theories relate the name to a small river not far from Kernavė, the core area of the early Lithuanian state and a possible first capital of the would-be Grand Duchy of Lithuania, is usually credited as the source of the name. This river's original name is Lietava. As time passed, the suffix -ava could have changed into -uva, as the two are from the same suffix branch. The river flows in the lowlands and easily spills over its banks, therefore the traditional Lithuanian form liet- could be directly translated as lietis (to spill), of the root derived from the Proto-Indo-European leyǝ-. However, the river is very small and some find it improbable that such a small and local object could have lent its name to an entire nation. On the other hand, such a fact is not unprecedented in world history. The most credible modern theory of etymology of the name of Lithuania (Lithuanian: Lietuva) is Artūras Dubonis's hypothesis, that Lietuva relates to the word leičiai (plural of leitis, a social group of warriors-knights in the early Grand Duchy of Lithuania). The title of the Grand Duchy was consistently applied to Lithuania from the 14th century onward.

In other languages, the grand duchy is referred to as:

 or 

Old literary Lithuanian: Didi Kunigystė Lietuvos (didi Kunigiſte Lietuwos)

Ruthenian: Великое кнѧзство Литовское

Naming convention of both title of ruler (hospodar) and the state changed as it expanded its territory. Following the decline of the Kingdom of Ruthenia and incorporation of its lands into the Grand Duchy of Lithuania, Gediminas started to title himself as "King of Lithuanians and many Ruthenians", while the name of the state became the Grand Duchy of Lithuania and Ruthenia. Similarly the title changed to "King of Lithuanians and Ruthenians, ruler and duke of Semigallia" when Semigallia became part of the state. The 1529 edition of the Statute of Lithuania described the titles of Sigismund I the Old as "King of Poland, the Grand Duke of Lithuania, Ruthenia, Prussia, Samogitia, Mazovia, and other [ lands ]".

The country was also called the Republic of Lithuania since at least the mid-16th century, already before the Union of Lublin in 1569.

History

Establishment of the state

The first written reference to Lithuania is found in the Quedlinburg Chronicle, which dates from 1009. In the 12th century, Slavic chronicles refer to Lithuania as one of the areas attacked by the Rus'. Pagan Lithuanians initially paid tribute to Polotsk, but they soon grew in strength and organized their own small-scale raids. At some point between 1180 and 1183 the situation began to change, and the Lithuanians started to organize sustainable military raids on the Slavic provinces, raiding the Principality of Polotsk as well as Pskov, and even threatening Novgorod. The sudden spark of military raids marked consolidation of the Lithuanian lands in Aukštaitija. The Lithuanians are the only branch within the Baltic group that managed to create a state entity in premodern times.

The Lithuanian Crusade began after the Livonian Order and Teutonic Knights, crusading military orders, were established in Riga and in Prussia in 1202 and 1226 respectively. The Christian orders posed a significant threat to pagan Baltic tribes, and further galvanized the formation of the Lithuanian state. The peace treaty with Galicia–Volhynia of 1219 provides evidence of cooperation between Lithuanians and Samogitians. This treaty lists 21 Lithuanian dukes, including five senior Lithuanian dukes from Aukštaitija (Živinbudas, Daujotas, Vilikaila, Dausprungas and Mindaugas) and several dukes from Žemaitija. Although they had battled in the past, the Lithuanians and the Žemaičiai now faced a common enemy. Likely Živinbudas had the most authority and at least several dukes were from the same families. The formal acknowledgement of common interests and the establishment of a hierarchy among the signatories of the treaty foreshadowed the emergence of the state.

Kingdom of Lithuania

Mindaugas, the duke of southern Lithuania, was among the five senior dukes mentioned in the treaty with Galicia–Volhynia. The Livonian Rhymed Chronicle, reports that by the mid-1230s, Mindaugas had acquired supreme power in the whole of Lithuania. In 1236, the Samogitians, led by Vykintas, defeated the Livonian Order in the Battle of Saule. The Order was forced to become a branch of the Teutonic Knights in Prussia, making Samogitia, a strip of land that separated Livonia from Prussia, the main target of both orders. The battle provided a break in the wars with the Knights, and Lithuania exploited this situation, arranging attacks on the Ruthenian provinces and annexing Navahrudak and Hrodna.

In 1248, a civil war broke out between Mindaugas and his nephews Tautvilas and Edivydas. The powerful coalition against Mindaugas included Vykintas, the Livonian Order, Daniel of Galicia and Vasilko of Volhynia. Taking advantage of internal conflicts, Mindaugas allied with the Livonian Order. He promised to convert to Christianity and exchange some lands in western Lithuania in return for military assistance against his nephews and the royal crown. In 1251, Mindaugas was baptized and Pope Innocent IV issued a papal bull proclaiming the creation of the Kingdom of Lithuania. After the civil war ended, Mindaugas was crowned as King of Lithuania on 6 July 1253, starting a decade of relative peace. Mindaugas later renounced Christianity and converted back to paganism. Mindaugas tried to expand his influence in Polatsk, a major centre of commerce in the Daugava River basin, and Pinsk. The Teutonic Knights used this period to strengthen their position in parts of Samogitia and Livonia, but they lost the Battle of Skuodas in 1259 and the Battle of Durbe in 1260. This encouraged the conquered Semigallians and Old Prussians to rebel against the Knights.

Encouraged by Treniota, Mindaugas broke the peace with the Order, possibly reverted to pagan beliefs. He hoped to unite all Baltic tribes under the Lithuanian leadership. As military campaigns were not successful, the relationships between Mindaugas and Treniota deteriorated. Treniota, together with Daumantas of Pskov, assassinated Mindaugas and his two sons, Ruklys and Rupeikis, in 1263. The state lapsed into years of internal fighting.

Rise of the Gediminids

From 1263 to 1269, Lithuania had three grand dukes – Treniota, Vaišvilkas, and Švarnas. The state did not disintegrate, however, and Traidenis came to power in 1269. He strengthened Lithuanian control in Black Ruthenia and fought with the Livonian Order, winning the Battle of Karuse in 1270 and the Battle of Aizkraukle in 1279. There is considerable uncertainty about the identities of the grand dukes of Lithuania between his death in 1282 and the assumption of power by Vytenis in 1295. During this time the Orders finalized their conquests. In 1274, the Great Prussian Rebellion ended, and the Teutonic Knights proceeded to conquer other Baltic tribes: the Nadruvians and Skalvians in 1274–1277, and the Yotvingians in 1283; the Livonian Order completed its conquest of Semigalia, the last Baltic ally of Lithuania, in 1291. The Orders could now turn their full attention to Lithuania. The "buffer zone" composed of other Baltic tribes had disappeared, and Grand Duchy of Lithuania was left to battle the Orders on its own.

The Gediminid dynasty ruled the grand duchy for over a century, and Vytenis was the first ruler of the dynasty. During his reign Lithuania was in constant war with the Order, the Kingdom of Poland, and Ruthenia. Vytenis was involved in succession disputes in Poland, supporting Boleslaus II of Masovia, who was married to a Lithuanian duchess, Gaudemunda. In the struggle against the Order, Vytenis allied with Riga's citizens; securing positions in Riga strengthened trade routes and provided a base for further military campaigns. Around 1307, Polotsk, an important trading centre, was annexed by military force. Vytenis also began constructing a defensive castle network along Nemunas. Gradually this network developed into the main defensive line against the Teutonic Order.

Territorial expansion

The expansion of the state reached its height under Grand Duke Gediminas, also titled by some contemporaneous German sources as Rex de Owsteiten, who created a strong central government and established an empire that later spread from the Black Sea to the Baltic Sea. In 1320, most of the principalities of western Rus' were either vassalized or annexed by Lithuania. In 1321, Gediminas captured Kiev, sending Stanislav, the last Rurikid to rule Kiev, into exile. Gediminas also re-established the permanent capital of the Grand Duchy in Vilnius, presumably moving it from Old Trakai in 1323. The state continued to expand its territory under the reign of Grand Duke Algirdas and his brother Kęstutis, who both ruled the state harmonically. The Lithuanian monarchs were being inaugurated in the Vilnius Cathedral until 1569 by placing the Gediminas' Cap on their heads.

Lithuania was in a good position to conquer the western and the southern parts of the former Kievan Rus'. While almost every other state around it had been plundered or defeated by the Mongols, the hordes stopped at the modern borders of Belarus, and the core territory of the Grand Duchy was left mostly untouched. The weak control of the Mongols over the areas they had conquered allowed the expansion of Lithuania to accelerate. Rus' principalities were never incorporated directly into the Golden Horde, maintaining vassal relationships with a fair degree of independence. Lithuania annexed some of these areas as vassals through diplomacy, as they exchanged rule by the Mongols or the Grand Prince of Moscow with rule by the Grand Duchy. An example is Novgorod, which was often in the Lithuanian sphere of influence and became an occasional dependency of the Grand Duchy. Lithuanian control resulted from internal frictions within the city, which attempted to escape submission to Moscow. Such relationships could be tenuous, however, as changes in a city's internal politics could disrupt Lithuanian control, as happened on a number of occasions with Novgorod and other East-Slavic cities.

The Grand Duchy of Lithuania managed to hold off Mongol incursions and eventually secured gains. In 1333 and 1339, Lithuanians defeated large Mongol forces attempting to regain Smolensk from the Lithuanian sphere of influence. By about 1355, the State of Moldavia had formed, and the Golden Horde did little to re-vassalize the area. In 1362, regiments of the Grand Duchy army defeated the Golden Horde at the Battle at Blue Waters. In 1380, a Lithuanian army allied with Russian forces to defeat the Golden Horde in the Battle of Kulikovo, and though the rule of the Mongols did not end, their influence in the region waned thereafter. In 1387, Moldavia became a vassal of Poland and, in a broader sense, of Lithuania. By this time, Lithuania had conquered the territory of the Golden Horde all the way to the Dnieper River. In a crusade against the Golden Horde in 1398 (in an alliance with Tokhtamysh), Lithuania invaded northern Crimea and won a decisive victory. In an attempt to place Tokhtamish on the Golden Horde throne in 1399, Lithuania moved against the Horde but was defeated in the Battle of the Vorskla River, losing the steppe region.

Personal Union with Poland 

Lithuania was Christianized in 1387, led by Jogaila, who personally translated Christian prayers into the Lithuanian language and his cousin Vytautas the Great who founded many Catholic churches and allocated lands for parishes in Lithuania. The state reached a peak under Vytautas the Great, who reigned from 1392 to 1430. Vytautas was one of the most famous rulers of the Grand Duchy of Lithuania, serving as the Grand Duke from 1401 to 1430, and as the Prince of Hrodna (1370–1382) and the Prince of Lutsk (1387–1389). Vytautas was the son of Kęstutis, uncle of Jogaila, who became King of Poland in 1386, and he was the grandfather of Vasili II of Moscow.

In 1410, Vytautas commanded the forces of the Grand Duchy in the Battle of Grunwald. The battle ended in a decisive Polish-Lithuanian victory against the Teutonic Order. The war of Lithuania against military Orders, which lasted for more than 200 years, and was one of the longest wars in the history of Europe, was finally ended. Vytautas backed the economic development of the state and introduced many reforms. Under his rule, the Grand Duchy of Lithuania slowly became more centralized, as the governours loyal to Vytautas replaced local princes with dynastic ties to the throne. The governours were rich landowners who formed the basis for the nobility of the Grand Duchy. During Vytautas' rule, the Radziwiłł and Goštautas families started to gain influence.

The rapid expansion of the influence of Moscow soon put it into a comparable position to the Grand Duchy of Lithuania, and after the annexation of Novgorod in 1478, Muscovy was among the preeminent states in northeastern Europe. Between 1492 and 1508, Ivan III further consolidated Muscovy, winning the key Battle of Vedrosha and regaining such ancient lands of Kievan Rus' as Chernihiv and Bryansk.

On 8 September 1514, the allied forces of the Grand Duchy of Lithuania and the Kingdom of Poland, under the command of Hetman Konstanty Ostrogski, fought the Battle of Orsha against the army of the Grand Duchy of Moscow, under Konyushy Ivan Chelyadnin and Kniaz Mikhail Golitsin. The battle was part of a long series of Muscovite–Lithuanian Wars conducted by Russian rulers striving to gather all the former lands of Kievan Rus' under their rule. According to Rerum Moscoviticarum Commentarii by Sigismund von Herberstein, the primary source for the information on the battle, the much smaller army of Poland–Lithuania (under 30,000 men) defeated the 80,000 Muscovite soldiers, capturing their camp and commander. The Muscovites lost about 30,000 men, while the losses of the Poland–Lithuania army totalled only 500. While the battle is remembered as one of the greatest Lithuanian victories, Muscovy ultimately prevailed in the war. Under the 1522 peace treaty, the Grand Duchy of Lithuania made large territorial concessions.

Polish–Lithuanian Commonwealth

The wars with the Teutonic Order, the loss of land to Moscow, and the continued pressure threatened the survival of the state of Lithuania, so it was forced to ally more closely with Poland, uniting with its western neighbour as the Polish–Lithuanian Commonwealth (Commonwealth of Two Nations) in the Union of Lublin of 1569. During the period of the Union, many of the territories formerly controlled by the Grand Duchy of Lithuania were transferred to the Crown of the Polish Kingdom, while the gradual process of Polonization slowly drew Lithuania itself under Polish domination. In 1655, Lithuania unilaterally seceded from Poland and fell under the protection of the Swedish Empire. However, by 1657 Lithuania was once again a part of the Commonwealth. The Grand Duchy retained many rights in the federation (including separate ministries, laws, army, and treasury) until the May Constitution of Poland and Reciprocal Guarantee of Two Nations were passed in 1791.

Partitions and the Napoleonic period
Following the partitions of the Polish–Lithuanian Commonwealth, most of the lands of the former Grand Duchy were directly annexed by the Russian Empire, the rest by Prussia. In 1812, just prior to the French invasion of Russia, the former Grand Duchy revolted against the Russians. Soon after his arrival in Vilnius, Napoleon proclaimed the creation of a Commissary Provisional Government of the Grand Duchy of Lithuania which, in turn, renewed the Polish-Lithuanian Union. The union was never formalized, however, as only half a year later Napoleon's Grande Armée was pushed out of Russia and forced to retreat further westwards. In December 1812, Vilnius was recaptured by Russian forces, bringing all plans for the recreation of the Grand Duchy to an end. Most of the lands of the former Grand Duchy were re-annexed by Russia. The Augustów Voivodeship (later Augustów Governorate), including the counties of Marijampolė and Kalvarija, was attached to the Kingdom of Poland, a rump state in personal union with Russia.

Administrative division

Administrative structure of the Grand Duchy of Lithuania (1413–1564).

Religion and culture

Christianity and paganism

After the baptism in 1252 and coronation of King Mindaugas in 1253, Lithuania was recognized as a Christian state until 1260, when Mindaugas supported an uprising in Courland and (according to the German order) renounced Christianity. Up until 1387, Lithuanian nobles professed their own religion, which was polytheistic. Ethnic Lithuanians were very dedicated to their faith. The pagan beliefs needed to be deeply entrenched to survive strong pressure from missionaries and foreign powers. Until the 17th century, there were relics of old faith reported by counter-reformation active Jesuit priests, like feeding žaltys with milk or bringing food to graves of ancestors. The lands of modern-day Belarus and Ukraine, as well as local dukes (princes) in these regions, were firmly Orthodox Christian (Greek Catholic after the Union of Brest), though. While pagan beliefs in Lithuania were strong enough to survive centuries of pressure from military orders and missionaries, they did eventually succumb. A separate Eastern Orthodox metropolitan eparchy was created sometime between 1315 and 1317 by the Constantinople Patriarch John XIII. Following the Galicia–Volhynia Wars which divided the Kingdom of Galicia–Volhynia between the Grand Duchy of Lithuania and the Kingdom of Poland, in 1355 the Halych metropoly was liquidated and its eparchies transferred to the metropoles of Lithuania and Volhynia.

In 1387, Lithuania converted to Catholicism, while most of the Ruthenian lands stayed Orthodox, however, on 22 February 1387, Supreme Duke Jogaila banned Catholics marriages with Orthodox, and demanded those Orthodox who previously married with the Catholics to convert to Catholicism. At one point, though, Pope Alexander VI reprimanded the Grand Duke for keeping non-Catholics as advisers. Consequently, only in 1563 did Grand Duke Sigismund II Augustus issue a privilege that equalized the rights of Orthodox and Catholics in Lithuania and abolished all previous restrictions on Orthodox. There was an effort to polarise Orthodox Christians after the Union of Brest in 1596, by which some Orthodox Christians acknowledged papal authority and Catholic catechism, but preserved their liturgy. The country also became one of the major centres of the Reformation.

In the second half of the 16th century, Calvinism spread in Lithuania, supported by the families of Radziwiłł, Chodkiewicz, Sapieha, Dorohostajski and others. By the 1580s the majority of the senators from Lithuania were Calvinist or Socinian Unitarians (Jan Kiszka).

In 1579, Stephen Báthory, King of Poland and Grand Duke of Lithuania, founded Vilnius University, one of the oldest universities in Northern Europe. Due to the work of the Jesuits during the Counter-Reformation the university soon developed into one of the most important scientific and cultural centres of the region and the most notable scientific centre of the Grand Duchy of Lithuania. The work of the Jesuits as well as conversions from among the Lithuanian senatorial families turned the tide and by the 1670s Calvinism lost its former importance though it still retained some influence among the ethnically Lithuanian peasants and some middle nobility.

Islam

Islam in Lithuania, unlike many other northern and western European countries, has a long history starting from 14th century. Small groups of Muslim Lipka Tatars migrated to ethnically Lithuanian lands, mainly under the rule of Grand Duke Vytautas (early 15th century). In Lithuania, unlike many other European societies at the time, there was religious freedom. Lithuanian Tatars were allowed to settle in certain places, such as Trakai and Kaunas. Keturiasdešimt Totorių is one of the oldest Tatar settlements in the Grand Duchy of Lithuania. After a successful military campaign of the Crimean Peninsula in 1397, Vytautas brought the first Crimean Tatar prisoners of war to Trakai and various places in the Duchy of Trakai, including localities near Vokė river just south of Vilnius. The first mosque in this village was mentioned for the first time in 1558. There were 42 Tatar families in the village in 1630.

Judaism

Languages

In the 13th century, the centre of the Grand Duchy of Lithuania was inhabited by a majority that spoke Lithuanian, though it was not a written language until the 16th century. In the other parts of the duchy, the majority of the population, including Ruthenian nobles and ordinary people, used both spoken and written Ruthenian. Nobles who migrated from one place to another would adapt to a new locality and adopt the local religion and culture and those Lithuanian noble families that moved to Slavic areas often took up the local culture quickly over subsequent generations. Ruthenians were native to the east-central and south-eastern parts of the Grand Duchy of Lithuania.

Ruthenian, also called Chancery Slavonic in its written form, was used to write laws alongside Polish, Latin and German, but its use varied between regions. From the time of Vytautas, there are fewer remaining documents written in Ruthenian than there are in Latin and German, but later Ruthenian became the main language of documentation and writings, especially in eastern and southern parts of the Duchy. In the 16th century at the time of the Polish–Lithuanian Commonwealth, Lithuanian lands became partially polonized over time and started to use Polish for writing much more often than the Lithuanian and Ruthenian languages. Polish finally became the official chancellery language of the Commonwealth in 1697.

The voivodeships with a predominantly ethnic Lithuanian population, Vilnius, Trakai, and Samogitian voivodeships, remained almost wholly Lithuanian-speaking, both colloquially and by ruling nobility. Ruthenian communities were also present in the extreme southern parts of Trakai voivodeship and south-eastern parts of Vilnius Voivodeship. In addition to Lithuanians and Ruthenians, other important ethnic groups throughout the Grand Duchy of Lithuania were Jews and Tatars.

Languages for state and academic purposes

Numerous languages were used in state documents depending on which period in history and for what purpose. These languages included Lithuanian, Ruthenian, Polish and, to a lesser extent (mostly in early diplomatic communication), Latin and German.

The Court used Ruthenian to correspond with Eastern countries while Latin and German were used in foreign affairs with Western countries. During the latter part of the history of the Grand Duchy, Polish was increasingly used in State documents, especially after the Union of Lublin. By 1697, Polish had largely replaced Ruthenian as the "official" language at Court, although Ruthenian continued to be used on a few official documents until the second half of the 18th century.

It is known that Jogaila, being ethnic Lithuanian by the man's line, himself knew and spoke in the Lithuanian language with Vytautas the Great, his cousin from the Gediminids dynasty. Also, during the Christianization of Samogitia, none of the clergy, who came to Samogitia with Jogaila, were able to communicate with the natives, therefore Jogaila himself taught the Samogitians about the Catholicism, thus he was able to communicate in the Samogitian dialect of the Lithuanian language. 

Use of Lithuanian still continued at the Court after the death of Vytautas and Jogaila. Since the young Grand Duke Casimir IV Jagiellon was underage, the supreme control over the Grand Duchy of Lithuania was in the hands of the Lithuanian Council of Lords, presided by Jonas Goštautas, while Casimir was taught Lithuanian language and the customs of Lithuania by appointed court officials. Casimir IV Jagiellon's son Saint Casimir, who was subsequently announced as patron saint of Lithuania, was a polyglot and among other languages knew Lithuanian. Grand Duke Alexander Jagiellon also could understand and speak Lithuanian. While Grand Duke Sigismund II Augustus maintained both Polish-speaking and Lithuanian-speaking equally large royal courts.

From the beginning of the 16th century, and especially after a rebellion led by Michael Glinski in 1508, there were attempts by the Court to replace the usage of Ruthenian with Latin. The use of Ruthenian by academics in areas formerly part of Rus' and even in Lithuania proper was widespread. Court Chancellor of the Grand Duchy of Lithuania Lew Sapieha noted in the preface of the Third Statute of Lithuania (1588) that all state documents to be written exclusively in Ruthenian. The same was stated in part 4 of the Statute:  Despite that, Polish-language editions stated the same in Polish. Statutes of the Grand Duchy were translated into Latin and Polish. One of the main reasons for translations into Latin was that Ruthenian had no well defined and codified law concepts and definitions, which caused many disputes in courts. Another reason to use Latin was a popular idea that Lithuanians were descendants of Romans – the mythical house of Palemonids. Augustinus Rotundus translated the Second Statute into Latin.

According to scientist Rita Regina Trimonienė, the Lithuanians surnames are not slavified and are written as they were pronounced by parishioners in the registers of baptism of Šiauliai Church (dated in the 17th century).

In 1552, Grand Duke Sigismund II Augustus ordered that orders of the Magistrate of Vilnius be announced in Lithuanian, Polish, and Ruthenian. The same requirement was valid for the Magistrate of Kaunas.

Mikalojus Daukša, writing in the introduction to his Postil (1599) (which was written in Lithuanian) in Polish, advocated the promotion of Lithuanian in the Grand Duchy, noting in the introduction that many people, especially szlachta, preferred to speak Polish rather than Lithuanian, but spoke Polish poorly, and gave a brief definition of the Lithuanian nation and state. Such were the linguistic trends in the Grand Duchy that, by the political reforms of 1564–1566, parliaments, local land courts, appellate courts and other State functions were recorded in Polish, and Polish became increasingly spoken across all social classes.

Lithuanian language situation

Ruthenian and Polish were used as state languages of the Grand Duchy of Lithuania, besides Latin and German in diplomatic correspondence. However, Lithuanian was dominant in parts of the Grand Duchy of Lithuania like Samogitia, where the local nobility's reliance on Lithuanian resulted in Stanislovas Radvila remarking in a letter to his brother Mikalojus Kristupas Radvila Našlaitėlis immediately after becoming the Elder of Samogitia that: "While learning various languages, I forgot Lithuanian, and now I see, I have to go to school again, because that language, as I see, God willing, will be needed." Vilnius, Trakai and Samogitia were the core voivodeships of the state, being part of Lithuania Proper, as evidenced by the privileged position of their governors in state authorities, such as the Council of Lords. Peasants in ethnic Lithuanian territories spoke exclusively Lithuanian, except in transitional border regions, but the Statutes of Lithuania and other laws and documentation were written in Ruthenian, Latin and Polish. Following the example of the royal court, there was a tendency to replace Lithuanian with Polish in the ethnic Lithuanian areas, whereas Ruthenian was stronger in ethnic Belarusian and Ukrainian territories. A note written by Sigismund von Herberstein's states that, in an ocean of Ruthenian in this part of Europe, there were two non-Ruthenian regions: Lithuania and Samogitia.

Since the founding of the Grand Duchy of Lithuania, the higher strata of Lithuanian society from ethnic Lithuania spoke Lithuanian, although from the later 16th century gradually began using Polish, and those from Ruthenia – Ruthenian. Samogitia was unique because of its economic situation – it lay near sea ports and there were fewer people under corvee, instead of that, many commoners were taxpayers. As a result, the stratification of society was not as sharp as in other areas. Being more similar to a commoner population, the local szlachta spoke Lithuanian to a bigger extent than in the areas close to the capital Vilnius, which itself had become the starting point of intensive linguistic Polonization of the surrounding areas since the 18th century.

In Vilnius University, there are preserved texts written in the Lithuanian language of the Vilnius area, a dialect of Eastern Aukštaitian, which was spoken in a territory located south-eastwards from Vilnius. The sources are preserved in works of graduates from Stanislovas Rapolionis-based Lithuanian language schools, graduate Martynas Mažvydas and Rapalionis relative Abraomas Kulvietis.

One of the main sources of Lithuanian written in the Eastern Aukštaitian dialect (Vilnius dialect) was preserved by Konstantinas Sirvydas in a trilingual (Polish-Latin-Lithuanian) 17th-century dictionary, Dictionarium trium linguarum in usum studiosæ juventutis, which was the main Lithuanian dictionary used until the late 19th century.

Universitas lingvarum Litvaniæ, published in Vilnius, 1737, is the oldest surviving grammar of the Lithuanian language published in the territory of the Grand Duchy of Lithuania (see also: Grammatica Litvanica, published in 1653).

In the Compendium Grammaticae Lithvanicae, published in 1673, three dialects of the Lithuanian language are distinguished: Samogitian dialect of Samogitia, Royal Lithuania and Ducal Lithuania. The Ducal Lithuanian language is described as pure, half-Samogitian and having elements of the Curonian language. Authors of the Compendium Grammaticae Lithvanicae singled out that the Lithuanians of the Vilnius Region tend to speak harshly, almost like Austrians, Bavarians and others speak German in Germany.

Demographics

In 1260, the Grand Duchy of Lithuania was the land of Lithuania, and ethnic Lithuanians formed the majority (67.5%) of its 400,000 people. With the acquisition of new Ruthenian territories, in 1340 this portion decreased to 30%. By the time of the largest expansion towards Rus' lands, which came at the end of the 13th and during the 14th century, the territory of the Grand Duchy of Lithuania was 800 to 930 thousand km2, just 10% to 14% of which was ethnically Lithuanian.

On 6 May 1434, Grand Duke Sigismund Kęstutaitis released his privilege which tied the Orthodox and Catholic Lithuanian nobles rights in order to attract the Slavic nobles of the eastern regions of the Grand Duchy of Lithuania who supported the former Grand Duke Švitrigaila.

An estimate of the population in the territory of Poland and Grand Duchy of Lithuania together gives a population at 7.5 million for 1493, breaking them down by ethnicity at 3.75 million Ruthenians (ethnic Ukrainians, Belarusians), 3.25 million Poles and 0.5 million Lithuanians. With the Union of Lublin, 1569, Lithuanian Grand Duchy lost large part of lands to the Polish Crown.

According to an analysis of the tax registers in 1572, Lithuania proper had 850,000 residents of which 680,000 were Lithuanians.

In the mid and late 17th century, due to Russian and Swedish invasions, there was much devastation and population loss on throughout the Grand Duchy of Lithuania, including ethnic Lithuanian population in Vilnius surroundings. Besides devastation, the Ruthenian population declined proportionally after the territorial losses to Russian Empire. By 1770 there were about 4.84 million inhabitants in the territory of 320 thousand km2, the biggest part of whom were inhabitants of Ruthenia and about 1.39 million or 29% – of ethnic Lithuania. During the following decades, the population decreased in a result of partitions.

Legacy

Prussian tribes (of Baltic origin) were the subject of Polish expansion, which was largely unsuccessful, so Duke Konrad of Masovia invited the Teutonic Knights to settle near the Prussian area of settlement. The fighting between Prussians and the Teutonic Knights gave the more distant Lithuanian tribes time to unite. Because of strong enemies in the south and north, the newly formed Lithuanian state concentrated most of its military and diplomatic efforts on expansion eastward.

The rest of the former Ruthenian lands were conquered by the Grand Duchy of Lithuania. Some other lands in Ukraine were vassalized by Lithuania later. The subjugation of Eastern Slavs by two powers created substantial differences between them that persist to this day. While there were certainly substantial regional differences in Kievan Rus', it was the Lithuanian annexation of much of southern and western Ruthenia that led to the permanent division between Ukrainians, Belarusians, and Russians. And even four Grand Dukes of Lithuania are appeared on the Millennium of Russia monument.

In the 19th century, the romantic references to the times of the Grand Duchy of Lithuania were an inspiration and a substantial part of both the Lithuanian and Belarusian national revival movements and Romanticism in Poland.

Notwithstanding the above, Lithuania was a kingdom under Mindaugas, who was crowned by the authority of Pope Innocent IV in 1253. Vytenis, Gediminas and Vytautas the Great also assumed the title of King, although uncrowned by the Pope. A failed attempt was made in 1918 to revive the Kingdom under a German Prince, Wilhelm Karl, Duke of Urach, who would have reigned as Mindaugas II of Lithuania.

In the first half of the 20th century, the memory of the multiethnic history of the Grand Duchy was revived by the Krajowcy movement, which included Ludwik Abramowicz (Liudvikas Abramovičius), Konstancja Skirmuntt, Mykolas Römeris (Michał Pius Römer), Józef Albin Herbaczewski (Juozapas Albinas Herbačiauskas), Józef Mackiewicz and Stanisław Mackiewicz. This feeling was expressed in poetry by Czesław Miłosz.

Pseudoscientific theory of litvinism was developed since the 1990s.

According to the 10th article of the Law on the State Flag and Other Flags of the Republic of Lithuania, adopted by the Seimas, the historical Lithuanian state flag (with horseback knight on a red field, which initial design dates back to the reign of Grand Duke Vytautas the Great) must be constantly raised over the most important governmental buildings (e.g. Seimas Palace, Government of Lithuania and its ministries, Lithuanian courts, municipal council buildings) and significant historical buildings (e.g. Palace of the Grand Dukes of Lithuania, Trakai Island Castle), also in Kernavė and in the site of the Senieji Trakai Castle.

Gallery

See also

References

Sources
 Grand Duchy of Lithuania: Encyclopedia in Three Volumes, Volume I, 2nd edition, 2007. 688 pages, illustrated, 
 Grand Duchy of Lithuania: Encyclopedia in Three Volumes, Volume II, 2nd edition, 2007. 792 pages, illustrated, 
 Grand Duchy of Lithuania: Encyclopedia in Three Volumes, Volume III, 1st edition, 2010. 696 pages, illustrated, 
 Norman Davies. God's Playground. Columbia University Press; 2nd edition (2002), .
 
 Robert Frost. The Oxford History of Poland-Lithuania: Volume I: The Making of the Polish-Lithuanian Union, 1385–1569. Oxford University Press, 2015, 
 Alan V. Murray. Crusade and Conversion on the Baltic Frontier 1150–1500 (Cambridge Studies in Medieval Life and Thought: Fourth Series). Routledge, 2001. .
 Alan V. Murray. The Clash of Cultures on the Medieval Baltic Frontier Routledge, 2016. .
 Zenonas Norkus. An Unproclaimed Empire: The Grand Duchy of Lithuania: From the Viewpoint of Comparative Historical Sociology of Empires, Routledge, 2017, 426 p. 
 S. C. Rowell. Chartularium Lithuaniae res gestas magni ducis Gedeminne illustrans. Gedimino laiškai. Vilnius, 2003, . e-copy
 S. C. Rowell. Lithuania Ascending: A Pagan Empire within East-Central Europe, 1295–1345 (Cambridge Studies in Medieval Life and Thought: Fourth Series). Cambridge University Press, 2014. .
 S. C. Rowell, D. Baronas. The conversion of Lithuania. From pagan barbarians to late medieval Christians. Vilnius, 2015, .
 Daniel Z. Stone. The Polish-Lithuanian State, 1386–1795. University of Washington Press. 2014. pp. xii, 374. 
 A. Dubonis, D. Antanavičius, R. Ragauskiene, R. Šmigelskytė-Štukienė. The Lithuanian Metrica : History and Research. Academic Studies Press. Brighton, United States, 2020. 
 Jūratė Kiaupienė. Between Rome and Byzantium: The Golden Age of the Grand Duchy of Lithuania's Political Culture. Second half of the fifteenth century to first half of the seventeenth century. Academic Studies Press. Brighton, United States, 2020.

External links

 History of the Grand Duchy of Lithuania
 Cheryl Renshaw. The Grand Duchy of Lithuania 1253–1795
 Grand Duchy of Lithuania
 Grand Duchy of Lithuania administrative map
 Lithuanian-Ruthenian state at the Encyclopedia of Ukraine
 Zenonas Norkus. The Grand Duchy of Lithuania in the Retrospective of Comparative Historical Sociology of Empires

 
Medieval Lithuania
Medieval Belarus
Medieval Ukraine
Medieval Poland
Medieval Russia
Early Modern history of Lithuania
Early Modern history of Belarus
Early Modern history of Ukraine
Early Modern history of Poland
Early Modern history of Russia
Lithuania
Lithuania, Grand Duchy
Polish–Lithuanian union
Subdivisions of the Polish–Lithuanian Commonwealth
1230s establishments in Europe
1795 disestablishments in Europe
1795 disestablishments in the Polish–Lithuanian Commonwealth
States and territories established in the 13th century
States and territories disestablished in the 18th century
Former countries
Former monarchies of Europe